John William Richardson (October 3, 1892 – January 18, 1970) was a Major League Baseball pitcher who played in  and  with the Philadelphia Athletics.

External links

1892 births
1970 deaths
Major League Baseball pitchers
Baseball players from Illinois
Philadelphia Athletics players
York Prohibitionists players
Topeka Jayhawks players
Marshalltown Ansons players